Clara H. Scott (December 3, 1841 – June 21, 1897), née Fiske, was an American composer, hymnwriter and publisher. She was the first woman to publish a volume of anthems, the Royal Anthem Book, in 1882. Scott was also well known for her hymn, Open My Eyes, That I May See, written in 1895. The hymn was inspired by Psalm 119, verse 18. She died in 1897 after being thrown from her carriage by a spooked horse.

References

External links
Free scores at the Mutopia Project
Scott, Clara at Hymnary.org

1841 births
1897 deaths
American composers
American Christian hymnwriters
Composers of Christian music
19th-century American musicians
Accidental deaths in Iowa
American women hymnwriters
19th-century women writers
American music publishers (people)
19th-century American businesspeople
19th-century American women musicians